Charade: Music from the Motion Picture Score Composed and Conducted by Henry Mancini is a soundtrack album from the 1963 movie Charade starring Cary Grant and Audrey Hepburn. The music was composed and conducted by Henry Mancini. It entered Billboard magazine's pop album chart on February 1, 1964, peaked at No. 6, and remained on the chart for 18 weeks. AllMusic gave the album a rating of four-and-a-half stars. Reviewer Stephen Cook called it "an easy listening tour of continental musical history" and "a great Mancini recording."

The title song, "Charade" was released as a single. It reached No. 15 on the adult contemporary chart and No. 36 on the Billboard Hot 100.

Track listing

Original 1963 release

2012 Intrada reissue
In 2012, Intrada Records released the complete score as heard in the film (the previous soundtrack album was a re-recording).

References

1963 soundtrack albums
RCA Victor soundtracks
Henry Mancini albums
Albums conducted by Henry Mancini